The map data is for year 2012 from the World Bank. Numbers are in kWh per year.

Table 

The table uses 2012 data from the World Bank. Numbers are in kWh per year.

See also

Plotted maps
European countries by employment in agriculture (% of employed)
European countries by fossil fuel use (% of total energy)
European countries by health expense per person
European countries by military expenditure as a percentage of government expenditure
European countries by percent of population aged 0-14
European countries by percentage of urban population
European countries by percentage of women in national parliaments
List of sovereign states in Europe by life expectancy
List of sovereign states in Europe by number of Internet users

References

External links 

Electric power in Europe
Electricity economics
Lists of countries by per capita values